John Valentine may refer to:

John Valentine (composer) (1730–91), English composer, father of composer Ann Valentine
John Valentine (cricketer) (b. 1954), Canadian former cricketer
John Valentine (baseball) (1855–1903), American baseball player and umpire
John J. Valentine, Sr. (1840–1901), president of Wells Fargo
John L. Valentine (b. 1949), current Utah State Senator
John Valentine, character from Twilight Zone: The Movie
John Valentine (MP) for Orford (UK Parliament constituency)
Johnny Valentine may refer to:
Johnny Valentine (1928–2001), former professional wrestler
Johnny Valentine (footballer), played for Rangers FC in the 1957 Scottish League Cup Final
Johnny Valentine (singer), a pseudonym for Terry Fell
Johnny Valentine, the penname of Sasha Alyson